Hiroko Tsukumo (born September 11, 1970 in Hiroshima) is a retired volleyball player from Japan, who competed for the Japan women's national team in the 1990s. She was named Best Digger and Best Receiver at the 1998 FIVB Women's World Championship. Tsukumo played as a libero.

Individual awards
 1998 World Championship "Best Digger"
 1998 World Championship "Best Receiver"
 1999 FIVB World Cup "Best Digger"

References
 Profile

1970 births
Living people
Japanese women's volleyball players
Sportspeople from Hiroshima
Asian Games medalists in volleyball
Volleyball players at the 1998 Asian Games
Medalists at the 1998 Asian Games
Asian Games bronze medalists for Japan